Cristian David Duma (born 15 July 1996) is an Argentine footballer who plays as a forward for Club Sol de América.

Career

Duma started his career with Argentine second division side Douglas Haig, where he made 46 appearances and scored 14 goals.

Duma was the top scorer of the 2018–19 Copa Argentina with 4 goals.

In 2019, he signed for Nacional, one of the most successful clubs in Uruguay.

In 2020, he signed for Spanish third division team Salamanca UDS.

Before the 2021 season, Duma signed for Deportes Santa Cruz in the Primera B de Chile. On first half 2022, he played for Deportes Iquique in the same division.

References

External links
 
 
 

Living people
1996 births
Argentine footballers
People from Pergamino
Association football forwards
Primera Nacional players
Torneo Federal A players
Uruguayan Primera División players
Segunda División B players
Primera B de Chile players
Paraguayan Primera División players
Club Atlético Douglas Haig players
Club Nacional de Football players
Salamanca CF UDS players
Deportes Santa Cruz footballers
Deportes Iquique footballers
Club Sol de América footballers
Argentine expatriate footballers
Argentine expatriate sportspeople in Uruguay
Argentine expatriate sportspeople in Spain
Argentine expatriate sportspeople in Chile
Expatriate footballers in Uruguay
Expatriate footballers in Spain
Expatriate footballers in Chile
Sportspeople from Buenos Aires Province